The Arc is a  river in the Savoie département of south-eastern France. Its source is near the border with Italy, in the Graian Alps, northeast of Bonneval-sur-Arc. The valley of the Arc, the Maurienne, is an important transport artery between France and Italy.

Towns crossed by the river

 Bonneval-sur-Arc
 Bessans
 Lanslevillard
 Lanslebourg-Mont-Cenis
 Termignon
 Sollières-Sardières
 Bramans
 Avrieux
 Villarodin-Bourget
 Modane
 Fourneaux
 Freney
 Saint-Michel-de-Maurienne
 Saint-Martin-de-la-Porte
 Saint-Julien-Mont-Denis
 Villargondran
 Saint-Jean-de-Maurienne
 La Chambre
 Épierre
 Argentine
 Aiguebelle
 Aiton

See also
 Arc (Provence), a river in southern France.
 List of rivers of France

References

Rivers of France
Rivers of Savoie
Rivers of Auvergne-Rhône-Alpes
Rivers of the Alps